Hans Knirsch (14 September 1877 in Třebařov – 6 December 1933 in Duchcov) was an Austro-German activist from Moravia for Austrian Nazism. After the breakup of the Austro-Hungarian Empire, he led the original party in Bohemia, called the German National Socialist Workers' Party. Together with Rudolf Jung and Hans Krebs, he was one of the original core that remained in the Nazi Party after 1933.

Biography 
Hans Knirsch became a Geschäftsführer, or managing leader, of the Mährisch-Trübauer Verband in 1901. In that capacity he published an appeal which extolled the political unification of all Germans into one state, referring to it as der alte Sehnsuchstraum der deutschen Demokraten ("the old nostalgic dream of the German democrats").

Active in several party congresses, before World War I he attempted to get the DAP to add the words "National Socialist" to their name. The effort failed, as the proposed name was felt to be too reminiscent of the Czech National Social Party Following his arrest for the failed Beer Hall Putsch, Hitler went on a hunger strike. It was Hans Knirsch who talked Hitler out of his depression and convinced him to resume eating.

Writings of Knirsch 
Aus der Geschichte der deutschen nationalsozialistischen Arbeiterbewegung Altösterreichs und der Tschechoslowakei, (Aussig, 1932).
Die Stellung der Deutschen zum tschechischen Staat. Referat, erstattet am 1. Gesamtparteitag der deutschen nationalsozialistischen Arbeiterpartei  Dux, Buchdruckerei "Gutenberg" 1919

References

External links
 

1877 births
1933 deaths
People from Svitavy District
People from the Margraviate of Moravia
Moravian-German people
German Workers' Party (Austria-Hungary) politicians
German National Socialist Workers' Party (Czechoslovakia) politicians
Members of the Austrian House of Deputies (1911–1918)
Members of the Provisional National Assembly
Members of the Chamber of Deputies of Czechoslovakia (1920–1925)
Members of the Chamber of Deputies of Czechoslovakia (1925–1929)
Members of the Chamber of Deputies of Czechoslovakia (1929–1935)
Suicides in Czechoslovakia
Czechoslovak politicians who committed suicide